CONAECDA (acronym for Conference of Autochthonous Ethnic Nationalities Communities Development Associations) is an organization that serves as a coalition of indigenous ethnic communities in central and northern Nigeria. CONAECDA works in diverse areas such as language development, community development, and indigenous land rights. It represents a few hundred indigenous groups that are spread across 15 Nigerian states.

Overview
CONAECDA has chapters in 15 Nigerian states, including Kogi State, Benue State, Yobe State, Kwara State, Plateau State, Kaduna State, Bauchi State, Nassarawa State, Taraba State, Adamawa State, Niger State, and other states.

Many ethnic groups from the Middle Belt of Nigeria have representatives with CONAECDA.

The Secretary General of CONAECDA is Dr. Suleman A.D. Sukukum.

Indigenous languages
CONAECDA is active in promoting minority and local ethnic languages in Nigeria. It has asked state governments in Nigeria to allow local ethnic languages to be taught in the educational system. It has also organized workshops and conferences across Nigeria relating to language development, language education, community development, and indigenous rights. CONAECDA also collaborates with SIL International on language documentation and development.

See also
Middle Belt
Herder–farmer conflicts in Nigeria

References

External links
Facebook
YouTube

Cultural organizations based in Nigeria
Advocacy groups in Nigeria
Language advocacy organizations
Community development organizations
Indigenous land rights
Indigenous politics
Middle Belt, Nigeria